Samuel Merritt may refer to:

Persons
 Dr. Samuel Merritt (1822–1890), a mayor of Oakland
 Samuel Augustus Merritt (1827–1910)

Schools
 Samuel Merritt University, formerly Samuel Merritt College

Fictional characters
 Gen. Samuel Merritt, the antagonist of the 1955 film Conquest of Space